The 1977 NBA World Championship Series was the championship round of the National Basketball Association (NBA)'s 1976–77 season, and the culmination of the season's playoffs. The Western Conference champion Portland Trail Blazers played against the Eastern Conference champion Philadelphia 76ers, with the 76ers holding home-court advantage. Their four regular season meetings had been split evenly, 2–2, with neither side winning away from home. The series was played under a best-of-seven format. 

The 1976–77 NBA season started with the ABA–NBA merger. Portland had benefited from the resulting ABA dispersal draft as they acquired Spirits of St. Louis power forward Maurice Lucas to partner with Bill Walton, and Philadelphia had signed ABA All-Star and 3-time ABA MVP Julius "Dr. J" Erving, who had taken the New York Nets to the ABA title the previous year. In the 1977 NBA Finals, five of the ten starting players were former ABA players (Julius Erving, Caldwell Jones, George McGinnis, Dave Twardzik, and Maurice Lucas).

While it was no surprise that Philadelphia had made it to the championship series, having posted the best record in the Eastern Conference (50-32), Portland's appearance in the finals was a mild surprise. Portland had joined the league in 1970 and it was making its playoff debut in its seventh season as the third best team in the Western Conference (49-33). It was also making its Finals debut after sweeping the Los Angeles Lakers in four close games in the Western Conference Finals to make this the second straight NBA Finals with at least one team making their first Finals appearance.

The series started 2-0 in favor of Philadelphia, but Portland rebounded in the next four games to become the second team to overcome a 2-0 deficit to win the Finals since the Boston Celtics in 1969 and the first to do so with four straight wins. No team would accomplish the feat again until 2006.

Background
The Portland Trail Blazers franchise entered the NBA as an expansion team in 1970, along with the Cleveland Cavaliers and the Buffalo Braves. Like most expansion teams, the Trail Blazers struggled, but in 1974, hope was on the way. 

Superstar center Bill Walton, who led UCLA to an 86-4 record and two national titles in three years, was drafted first overall by the Trail Blazers in the 1974 NBA draft. The Trail Blazers missed the playoffs the next two seasons as Walton struggled with injuries, but continued to add key pieces, such as Dave Twardzik, Lloyd Neal, Lionel Hollins, and Maurice Lucas. In 1976, Jack Ramsay was hired as head coach, and with a fully healthy Walton, Portland made the playoffs for the first time in the 1976–77 season, winning 49 games. The 3rd seeded Blazers would defeat the Chicago Bulls in three games, the Denver Nuggets in six games, and then shockingly swept league MVP Kareem Abdul-Jabbar and the top-seeded Los Angeles Lakers in the conference finals.

The Philadelphia 76ers made it back to the playoffs in 1976, after missing the previous four years, which included a league-worst nine wins in the 1972–73 season. They acquired former ABA All-Star Julius Erving, late of the New York Nets, in the offseason. The 76ers won 50 games for the first time since 1969, defeated the defending champion Boston Celtics in a tough seven-game series, then advanced to the finals for the first time since  by ousting the Houston Rockets in six games.

Road to the Finals

Regular season series
Both teams split the four-game series, each won by the home team.

Team rosters

Series summary

Trail Blazers win series 4–2

Game summaries

Game 1

Game 1 started with a Dr. J windmill slam dunk off the opening tip, and never got much better for the Blazers, who committed 34 turnovers. Erving scored 33 points and Doug Collins had 30, as the 76ers won 107–101. Walton finished with 28 points and 20 rebounds.

Game 2

Game 2 was an easy 107–89 win for the 76ers, who at one point scored 14 points in under 3 minutes. In the final 5 minutes, however, Philadelphia's Darryl Dawkins and Portland's Bob Gross both went up for a rebound and wrestled each other to the floor. Dawkins and Gross squared off and both benches cleared, including the coaches. In the middle of the fray, Maurice Lucas, in an act of team unity and in support of Gross, slapped Dawkins from behind and challenged him. Dawkins and Lucas were ejected, and Doug Collins needed four stitches after he caught a punch from Dawkins that had missed its target. Dawkins and Lucas were each fined $2,500. This brawl is commonly looked upon as the turning point in this series, as the Blazers unified and showed the Sixers that they wouldn't be humiliated.

Game 3

The series moved to Portland for the next two games, and game 3 got underway following a few tense moments as Lucas approached the Philadelphia bench before the game and offered his hand in friendship to Dawkins and the 76ers. The Blazers offense took charge of the game, and posted a 42-point fourth quarter to win 129–107. The turning point came early in the fourth with the score 91-87, when Walton tipped in an alley-oop pass from Bob Gross over Darryl Dawkins, who knocked him to the floor. Dave Twardzik then stole the Sixers' ensuing inbounds pass and found Walton, who was back on his feet, for another alley-oop dunk. Lucas had 27 points and 12 rebounds, and Walton contributed 20 points, 18 rebounds, and 9 assists.

Game 4

Philadelphia attempted to use George McGinnis and Caldwell Jones on the inside for Game 4, but Walton had other ideas, going on a shot-blocking frenzy. Portland quickly led the game by 17 points and never looked back, scoring 41 points in the third quarter and winning 130–98, the largest margin of victory in a game 4 in NBA history.

Game 5

Game 5 returned to Philadelphia with the series tied 2–2. Philadelphia spent much of the first half fouling the Blazers, racking up 22 personal fouls and sending the half-time score into the 40s. The Blazers added another 40 points to their total in the third quarter, and with a little over 8 minutes left in the game, Portland led 91–69. Erving rallied his team late in the fourth, scoring 37 points himself, but the Sixers ultimately lost 110–104. Portland set numerous rebounding records for its team, 59 (48 defensive, team record) in all which stood until 1985, 24 (20 defensive, another team record) of which belonged to Walton alone; his team record still stands.

Game 6

Portland, now leading the series 3–2, arrived back home for Game 6 in the middle of the night to a crowd of 5,000 fans waiting at the airport. With just 48 minutes separating the Blazers from their first championship, "Blazermania" had gripped the city. Philadelphia kept the game close throughout the first quarter, but were down by 15 at halftime after the Blazers netted 40 points in the second quarter. Erving tried in vain to force a game 7 for his team, scoring 40 points, but Bill Walton's 20 points, 23 rebounds, 7 assists and 8 blocks kept the game in Portland's hands, as Philadelphia's George McGinnis missed the game-tying jump shot with 4 seconds left for a heart-stopping 109–107 Portland win. The crowd stormed onto the court in a frenzy.

Bill Walton was named finals MVP and was called "an inspiration" by the defeated Julius Erving. Maurice Lucas later said of Walton's post-game thrown jersey that was sent into the rushing crowd of fans, "if I had caught the shirt, I would have eaten it. Bill's my hero."

Portland was awarded two trophies for winning the NBA Championship: The Walter A. Brown Trophy, which was kept by the winning team for only a year until the next NBA Finals; and a newly designed trophy later to be known as the Larry O'Brien Trophy which was now to be kept by the winning team with a new one produced at every NBA Finals since. The Walter A. Brown Trophy was retired shortly after this game.

Notes
Game 6 of the Finals was originally scheduled to start at 10:30 local time on Sunday morning, because CBS wanted to accommodate a golf telecast of the Kemper Open (similar to 1976). Instead the NBA refused and CBS agreed to a noon start in Portland. Despite the fact that this was the Finals' clinching game, CBS cut away from their NBA coverage very quickly after the game ended, skipping the trophy presentation in the Portland locker room to instead televise the golf tournament.

The only known footage of the trophy presentation was of Blazers head coach Dr. Jack Ramsay voicing his opinion about Bill Walton's performance in the NBA Finals.

See also
1977 NBA Playoffs
1976–77 NBA season

References

Further reading

External links
Portland Trail Blazers Playoff Records
NBA History: Walton, Lucas Ignite 'Blazermania'
1977 NBA Season Summary - Basketball-Reference.com

National Basketball Association Finals
Finals
NBA
NBA
Basketball competitions in Portland, Oregon
1977 in Portland, Oregon
Basketball competitions in Philadelphia
1970s in Philadelphia
May 1977 sports events in the United States
June 1977 sports events in the United States
1977 in sports in Oregon
1977 in sports in Pennsylvania